A cemetery is land reserved for human or animal (pet) remains.

Cemetery or cemetary may also refer to:
 Cemetery (album), an album by Deja Voodoo
 "Cemetery" (Silverchair song), 1997
 "Cemetery" (Charlie Simpson song), 2011
 "Cemetery" (Missy Higgins song), 2018
 Cemetary (band), a Swedish metal band
 Cemetery Reach, a reach of the Brisbane River in Queensland, Australia